Mario Kvesić (born 2 August 2002) is a Croatian football midfielder currently playing for Přepeře .

Club career

iClinic Sereď
Kvesić was introduced by Sereď in early February 2021 and was signed on a half-season loan, arriving from Czech third division club FK Přepeře.

Kvesić made his Fortuna Liga debut on 9 February 2021 in a neutral ground fixture against Pohronie. He came on as a second half replacement for Sereď's long-term regular Adam Morong after 78 minutes of play, with the score already set at 0:2 for the Žiar nad Hronom-based club, following an own goal by Martin Mečiar's and Alieu Fadera's strike. The match was influenced by snowfall and soaked surface.

References

External links
 ŠKF Sereď official club profile 
 

2002 births
Living people
People from Đakovo
Croatian footballers
Croatian expatriate footballers
Association football midfielders
ŠKF Sereď players
Bohemian Football League players
Slovak Super Liga players
Expatriate footballers in the Czech Republic
Croatian expatriate sportspeople in the Czech Republic
Expatriate footballers in Slovakia
Croatian expatriate sportspeople in Slovakia